Jan Barazan (also Romanized as Jān Barāzān; also known as Jombarzan, Jumbarazun, and Maḩalleh-ye Jān Bārāzūn) is a village in Shirkuh Rural District, in the Central District of Taft County, Yazd Province, Iran. At the 2006 census, its population was 290, in 84 families.

References 

Populated places in Taft County